Scaphyglottis crurigera is a species of orchid found from Mexico (Oaxaca, Chiapas) to Ecuador.

References

External links

crurigera
Orchids of Mexico
Flora of Oaxaca
Orchids of Chiapas
Orchids of Ecuador